Lozikeyi Dlodlo, sometimes Lozigeyi (died 1919) was a queen of the Ndebele people.

Background 
Lozikeyi was one of the favourite wives of Lobengula, and a senior queen, until 1893. She had no sons, only daughters, yet even so was influential in the attempt to have the son of a co-wife serve as her husband's successor. She was known for her outspokenness and for her defiance of the white settlers in what would later become Rhodesia. When her husband disappeared, she served for a time as de facto regent of the kingdom. Her place of retirement in the Bembezi River was an island which came to be known as the "Queen's Location". Lozikeyi died at Nkosikazi in Bubi District of influenza; her grave in the vicinity may still be visited, although its condition has been described as "neglected". Nearby is a school for which she lobbied and which she opened; it still serves students, although it has not been modernized. She was the subject of a biography, Lozikeyi Dlodlo Queen of the Ndebele: "A Very Dangerous and Intriguing Woman" by Marieke Faber Clarke and Pathisa Nyathi, published in 2013. Four photographs of her are in the collection of the Bodleian Library in Oxford, which featured her in an exhibit during the construction of a new wing.

Queen of the Ndebele 
Queen Lozikeyi took over leadership of the Ndebele nation due to the constitutional precedent among the Nguni people. Queen Lozikeyi was not the first woman to lead in this capacity. But rather was a part of a collection of strong influential royal woman in Nguni society. Queen Labotsibeni Mdluli was queen mother of Swaziland from 1889 to her death in 1925.

Anglo-Matabele war of 1896 
Lozikeyi Dlodlo played an important role in the Anglo-Matabele war of 1896. She was in charge of the King's army, thanks to her Dlodlo powers. Together with her twin brother, Muntuwani, she ensured that the army had enough ammunition ahead of the 1896 war by using the weaponry her husband did not use in the first Anglo-Matabele war of 1893.

References

1919 deaths
19th-century rulers in Africa
20th-century rulers in Africa
Women rulers in Africa
Deaths from Spanish flu
Infectious disease deaths in Zimbabwe
People from Matabeleland North Province
Ndebele
Year of birth unknown